Evangelos Makrygiannis (born 18 June 2000) is a Greek swimmer. He competed in the 2020 Summer Olympics.

References

2000 births
Living people
Swimmers at the 2020 Summer Olympics
Greek male swimmers
Olympic swimmers of Greece
21st-century Greek people
Mediterranean Games medalists in swimming
Mediterranean Games gold medalists for Greece
Swimmers at the 2022 Mediterranean Games